Gilmar dos Santos Neves (1930–2013) is a Brazilian football (soccer) goalkeeper.

Gilmar may also refer to:

 Gilmar Antônio Batista (born 1970), Brazilian footballer
 Gilmar Lobato da Rocha (born 1973), Brazilian-Portuguese footballer
 Gilmar Mayo (born 1969), Colombian high jumper
 Gilmar Pisas (born 1971), Curaçaoan politician
 Gilmar Rinaldi (born 1959), Brazilian footballer
 Gilmar Silva (born 1984), Brazilian footballer
 Gilmar Fubá (1975–2021), Brazilian footballer

See also
 
 Gilmer (disambiguation)